Sokobond is a puzzle video game created by Alan Hazelden and Harry Lee. The game was released on Linux, OS X, Windows-based personal computers in August 2013. It was later released for Nintendo Switch in September 2021.

Gameplay
Sokobond is a puzzle video game that tasks players with pushing atoms around a stage to form molecules. It mimics the style of Sokoban.

Development and release
Sokobond was created by independent developers Alan Hazelden and Harry Lee. The game's music was composed by Allison Walker. The game was released on Linux, OS X, Windows-based personal computers on 27 August 2013. The game was later released on the digital distribution service Steam, after being greenlit by the community.

Reception

Sokobond received "generally favorable" reviews from professional critics according to review aggregator website Metacritic.

References

External links
 

2013 video games
Linux games
MacOS games
 Indie video games
Puzzle video games
Video games developed in the United Kingdom
Windows games